KF Sharri is a professional football club from Kosovo which competes in the Second League. The club is based in Hani i Elezit. Their home ground is the Suad Brava Stadium which has a seating capacity of 500.

Fan ultras group : Boys of Border
City:Hani i Elezit

Players 
 Captain: Muhabi Bushi

References

Football clubs in Kosovo
Association football clubs established in 1973